Release may refer to:

 Art release, the public distribution of an artistic production, such as a film, album, or song
 Legal release, a legal instrument
 News release, a communication directed at the news media
 Release (ISUP), a code to identify and debug events in ISUP signaling
 Release (phonetics), the opening of the closure of a stop consonant
 Release from imprisonment
 Release, in medical classification, a root operation in the ICD-10 Procedure Coding System
 Software release, a distribution of a computer software in the software release life cycle

Film and television 
 Release (film), a 2010 British film starring Daniel Brocklebank
 "Release" (Angel), a television episode
 "Release" (Law & Order), a television episode
 "Release" (The X-Files), a television episode
 "The Release" (Animorphs), a television episode
 "The Release" (Entourage), a television episode

Music 
 Release, part of the A(ttack)D(ecay)S(sustain)R(release) envelope of a musical note
 Release, a bridge in thirty-two-bar form
 Release Entertainment, a subsidiary label of Relapse Records

Albums 
 Release (Cop Shoot Cop album), 1994
 Release (Damon Johnson album) or the title song, 2010
 Release (David Knopfler album), 1983
 Release (Pet Shop Boys album), 2002
 Release (Sister Hazel album) or the title song, 2009

Songs 
 "Release" (The Tea Party song), 1998
 "Release" (Timbaland song), 2008
 "Release (The Tension)", by Patti LaBelle, 1980
 "Release", by Afro Celt Sound System from Volume 2: Release, 1999
 "Release", by George from Polyserena, 2002
 "Release", by Imagine Dragons from Smoke + Mirrors, 2015
 "Release", by Paul McCartney from Standing Stone, 1997
 "Release", by Pearl Jam from Ten, 1991
 "Release, Release", by Yes from Tormato, 1978

Organizations 
 Release (agency), a UK agency that provides legal services for young people charged with drug possession
 Release International, an organization for monitoring persecution of Christians
 Release Magazine, a Swedish alternative music online magazine

See also 
 Delayed release (disambiguation)
 Flash release, a grape-pressing technique
 Dismissal (employment), termination of employment
 Release time, in US public schools, time set aside for students' private religious education
 Released (disambiguation)